Second seeds Yuki Bhambri and Michael Venus won the title over Sriram Balaji and Blaž Rola 6–4, 7–6(7–3).

Seeds

Draw

Draw

References 
 Main draw

Shriram Capital P.L. Reddy Memorial Challenger - Doubles
2014 Doubles